Crane Township is one of the thirteen townships of Wyandot County, Ohio, United States.  The 2010 census found 7,514 people in the township, 6,596 of whom lived in the city of Upper Sandusky.

Geography
Located in the center of the county, it borders the following townships:
Tymochtee Township - north
Eden Township - east
Antrim Township - southeast
Pitt Township - south
Mifflin Township - southwest
Salem Township - west
Crawford Township - northwest corner

The city of Upper Sandusky, the county seat of Wyandot County, is located in central Crane Township.

Name and history
Statewide, the only other Crane Township is located in Paulding County.

Government
The township is governed by a three-member board of trustees, who are elected in November of odd-numbered years to a four-year term beginning on the following January 1. Two are elected in the year after the presidential election and one is elected in the year before it. There is also an elected township fiscal officer, who serves a four-year term beginning on April 1 of the year after the election, which is held in November of the year before the presidential election. Vacancies in the fiscal officership or on the board of trustees are filled by the remaining trustees.

References

External links
County website

Townships in Wyandot County, Ohio
Townships in Ohio